Tuscan may refer to:

Places
 A person from, or something of, from, or related to Tuscany, a region of Italy
 Tuscan Archipelago, islands off Tuscany, Italy.
 Tuscan, South Australia was a railway siding and locality in the Murray Mallee region of South Australia

Currency
 Tuscan pound
 Tuscan florin

Linguistics
 Etruscan language, an extinct language which gives its name to Tuscany
 Tuscan dialect, a central Italian dialectal group from which Italian first emerged
 Tuscan gorgia, a phonetic sound

Cars
 TVR Tuscan (disambiguation), sports cars manufactured by TVR
 TVR Tuscan Challenge, a motorsport event for TVR Tuscan cars

Other uses
 Tuscan cuisine
 Tuscan order, an architectural order
 Tuscan Dairy Farms, an American company
 Tuscan red, a color
 , several ships of the Royal Navy
 Tuscan (ship), several merchant ships
 Tuscan Sun Festival, a music and culture festival in Florence, Italy
 Tuscan, "Tipoff US/Canada", a database of possible terrorists linked with US Terrorist Identities Datamart Environment
 Tuscan, a slab serif typeface

See also
 Etruscan (disambiguation)
 Toscano (disambiguation)
 Tucson, Arizona, a city, sometimes misspelled "Tuscan"
 Tuscany (disambiguation)
 Tusken Raiders

Language and nationality disambiguation pages